St Ebba's School also known as St. Ebba's Girls' Higher Secondary School is located in DR Radhakrishnan Salai, Chennai, India .It was founded in 1886.

References

Schools in Chennai
Girls' schools in Tamil Nadu
High schools and secondary schools in Tamil Nadu
Educational institutions established in 1886
1886 establishments in British India